Gymnothorax is a genus of fish in the family Muraenidae found in Atlantic, Indian and Pacific Ocean. With more than 120 species, it the most speciose genus of moray eels.

Smith (2012) noted that Gymnothorax as currently recognized is polyphyletic, but cautioned that comparative studies are needed before action is taken to resurrect generic synonyms of Gymnothorax.

Species
Both FishBase and World Register of Marine Species recognize a total of 128 valid species in the genus. However, each database includes three species that the other does not list, which are noted in the list below.

 Gymnothorax afer Bloch, 1795 (Dark moray)
 Gymnothorax albimarginatus (Temminck & Schlegel, 1846) (White-margin moray)
Gymnothorax andamanensis 
 Gymnothorax angusticauda (M. C. W. Weber & de Beaufort, 1916) (Narrow-tail moray)
 Gymnothorax angusticeps (Hildebrand & F. O. Barton, 1949)
 Gymnothorax annasona Whitley, 1937 (Lord Howe Island moray)
 Gymnothorax annulatus D. G. Smith & E. B. Böhlke, 1997 (Ringed moray)
 Gymnothorax atolli (Pietschmann, 1935) (Atoll moray)
Gymnothorax aurocephalus Nashad, Mohapatra, Varghese & Bineesh, 2020 (Goldenhead moray)
 Gymnothorax australicola Lavenberg, 1992 (South Pacific moray)
 Gymnothorax austrinus E. B. Böhlke & McCosker, 2001 (Southern moray)
 Gymnothorax bacalladoi E. B. Böhlke & Brito, 1987 (Canary moray)
 Gymnothorax baranesi D. G. Smith, Brokovich & Einbinder, 2008
 Gymnothorax bathyphilus J. E. Randall & McCosker, 1975 (Deep-dwelling moray)
 Gymnothorax berndti Snyder, 1904 (Y-patterned moray)
 Gymnothorax breedeni McCosker & J. E. Randall, 1977 (Black-cheek moray)
 Gymnothorax buroensis (Bleeker, 1857) (Vagrant moray)
 Gymnothorax castaneus (D. S. Jordan & C. H. Gilbert, 1883) (Panamic green moray)
 Gymnothorax castlei E. B. Böhlke & J. E. Randall, 1999 (Castle's moray)
 Gymnothorax cephalospilus E. B. Böhlke & McCosker, 2001 (Head-spot moray)
 Gymnothorax chilospilus Bleeker, 1864 (Lip-spot moray)
 Gymnothorax chlamydatus Snyder, 1908 (Banded mud moray)
 Gymnothorax conspersus Poey, 1867 (Saddled moray)
 Gymnothorax cribroris Whitley, 1932 (Sieve-patterned moray)
 Gymnothorax davidsmithi McCosker & J. E. Randall, 2008 (Flores mud moray)
 Gymnothorax dorsalis Seale, 1917
 Gymnothorax dovii (Günther, 1870) (Fine-spotted moray)
Gymnothorax elaineheemstrae 
 Gymnothorax elegans Bliss, 1883 (Elegant moray)
 Gymnothorax emmae Prokofiev, 2010
 Gymnothorax enigmaticus McCosker & J. E. Randall, 1982 (Enigmatic moray)
 Gymnothorax equatorialis (Hildebrand, 1946) (Spot-tail moray)
 Gymnothorax eurostus (C. C. Abbott, 1860) (Abbott's moray)
 Gymnothorax eurygnathos E. B. Böhlke, 2001
 Gymnothorax favagineus Bloch & J. G. Schneider, 1801 (Laced moray)
 Gymnothorax fimbriatus (E. T. Bennett, 1832) (Fimbriated moray)
 Gymnothorax flavimarginatus (Rüppell, 1830) (Yellow-edged moray)
 Gymnothorax flavoculus (E. B. Böhlke & J. E. Randall, 1996) (Pale-nose moray)
 Gymnothorax formosus Bleeker, 1864
 Gymnothorax funebris Ranzani, 1839 (Green moray)
 Gymnothorax fuscomaculatus (L. P. Schultz, 1953) (Brown-spotted moray)
 Gymnothorax gracilicauda O. P. Jenkins, 1903 (Slender-tail moray)
 Gymnothorax griseus (Lacépède, 1803) (Geometric moray)
 Gymnothorax hansi Heemstra, 2004
 Gymnothorax hepaticus (Rüppell, 1830) (Liver-colored moray)
 Gymnothorax herrei Beebe & Tee-Van, 1933 (Herre's moray)
 Gymnothorax hubbsi J. E. Böhlke & E. B. Böhlke, 1977 (Lichen moray)
 Gymnothorax indicus Mohapatra, D. Ray, D. G. Smith & Mishra, 2016 (Indian unpatterened moray)
 Gymnothorax intesi (Fourmanoir & Rivaton, 1979) (White-tip moray)
 Gymnothorax isingteena (J. Richardson, 1845) (Indo-Pacific spotted moray)
 Gymnothorax javanicus (Bleeker, 1859) (Giant moray)
 Gymnothorax johnsoni (J. L. B. Smith, 1962) (White-spotted moray)
 Gymnothorax kidako (Temminck & Schlegel, 1846) (Kidako moray)
 Gymnothorax kolpos J. E. Böhlke & E. B. Böhlke, 1980 (Black-tail moray)
 Gymnothorax kontodontos E. B. Böhlke, 2000 (Short-tooth moray)
 Gymnothorax longinquus (Whitley, 1948)
 Gymnothorax maderensis (J. Y. Johnson, 1862) (Shark-tooth moray)
 Gymnothorax mareei Poll, 1953 (Spot-jaw moray)
 Gymnothorax margaritophorus Bleeker, 1864 (Blotch-necked moray)
 Gymnothorax marshallensis (L. P. Schultz, 1953) (Marshall Islands moray)
 Gymnothorax mccoskeri D. G. Smith & E. B. Böhlke, 1997
 Gymnothorax megaspilus E. B. Böhlke & J. E. Randall, 1995 (Oman moray)
 Gymnothorax melanosomatus K. H. Loh, K. T. Shao & H. M. Chen, 2011 (Black-body moray)
 Gymnothorax melatremus L. P. Schultz, 1953 (Dwarf moray)
 Gymnothorax meleagris (G. Shaw, 1795) (Turkey moray)
 Gymnothorax microspila (Günther, 1870)
 Gymnothorax microstictus E. B. Böhlke, 2000 (Small-spot moray) 
 Gymnothorax miliaris (Kaup, 1856) (Golden-tail moray)
 Gymnothorax minor (Temminck & Schlegel, 1846)
 Gymnothorax mishrai D. Ray, Mohapatra & D. G. Smith, 2015 (Bengal moray)
 Gymnothorax moluccensis (Bleeker, 1864) (Moluccan moray)
 Gymnothorax monochrous (Bleeker, 1856) (Drab moray)
 Gymnothorax monostigma (Regan, 1909) (One-spot moray)
 Gymnothorax mordax (Ayres, 1859) (California moray) 
 Gymnothorax moringa (G. Cuvier, 1829) (Spotted moray)
 Gymnothorax nasuta F. de Buen, 1961 (Easter Island moray)
 Gymnothorax neglectus S. Tanaka (I), 1911
 Gymnothorax nigromarginatus (Girard, 1858) (Black-edge moray)
 Gymnothorax niphostigmus H. M. Chen, K. T. Shao & C. T. Chen, 1996 (Snowflake-patched moray)
 Gymnothorax nubilus (J. Richardson, 1848) (Grey moray)
 Gymnothorax nudivomer (Günther, 1867) (Yellow-mouth moray)
 Gymnothorax nuttingi Snyder, 1904
 Gymnothorax obesus (Whitley, 1932) (Griffin's moray)
 Gymnothorax ocellatus Agassiz, 1831 (Caribbean ocellated moray)
 Gymnothorax odishi Mohapatra, Mohanty, Smith, Mishra, and Roy, 2018
 Gymnothorax panamensis (Steindachner, 1876) (Masked moray)
 Gymnothorax parini Collette, D. G. Smith & E. B. Böhlke, 1991
 Gymnothorax phalarus W. A. Bussing, 1998
 Gymnothorax phasmatodes (J. L. B. Smith, 1962) (Ghost moray)
 Gymnothorax philippinus D. S. Jordan & Seale, 1907 (Philippines moray)
 Gymnothorax pictus (J. N. Ahl, 1789) (Paint-spotted moray)
 Gymnothorax pikei Bliss, 1883 (Pike's moray)
 Gymnothorax pindae J. L. B. Smith, 1962 (Pinda moray)
 Gymnothorax polygonius Poey, 1875 (Polygon moray)
 Gymnothorax polyspondylus E. B. Böhlke & J. E. Randall, 2000
 Gymnothorax polyuranodon (Bleeker, 1854) (Freshwater moray)
 Gymnothorax porphyreus (Guichenot, 1848) (Low-fin moray)
 Gymnothorax prasinus (J. Richardson, 1848) (Yellow moray)
 Gymnothorax prionodon J. D. Ogilby, 1895 (Australian mottled moray)
 Gymnothorax prismodon E. B. Böhlke & J. E. Randall, 2000
 Gymnothorax prolatus K. Sasaki & Amaoka, 1991
 Gymnothorax pseudoherrei E. B. Böhlke, 2000 (False brown moray) 
 Gymnothorax pseudomelanosomatus K. H. Loh, K. T. Shao & H. M. Chen, 2015 (False black-body moray)
 Gymnothorax pseudothyrsoideus (Bleeker, 1853) (High-fin moray)
 Gymnothorax pseudotile Mohapatra, Smith, Ray, Mishra & Mohanty, 2017 (Bengal low-fin moray) 
 Gymnothorax punctatofasciatus Bleeker, 1863 (Bars'n-spots moray)
 Gymnothorax punctatus Bloch & J. G. Schneider, 1801 (Red Sea white-spotted moray)
 Gymnothorax randalli D. G. Smith & E. B. Böhlke, 1997 (Randall's moray)
 Gymnothorax reevesii (J. Richardson, 1845) (Reeve's moray)
 Gymnothorax reticularis Bloch, 1795
 Gymnothorax richardsonii (Bleeker, 1852) (Richardson's moray)
 Gymnothorax robinsi E. B. Böhlke, 1997 (Robins' moray)
 Gymnothorax rueppelliae (McClelland, 1844) (Banded moray)
 Gymnothorax ryukyuensis Hatooka, 2003
 Gymnothorax sagenodeta (Richardson, 1848)
 Gymnothorax sagmacephalus E. B. Böhlke, 1997
 Gymnothorax saxicola D. S. Jordan & B. M. Davis, 1891 (Ocellated moray)
 Gymnothorax serratidens (Hildebrand & F. O. Barton, 1949)
 Gymnothorax shaoi H. M. Chen & K. H. Loh, 2007
 Gymnothorax sokotrensis Kotthaus, 1968
 Gymnothorax steindachneri D. S. Jordan & Evermann, 1903 (Steindachner's moray)
 Gymnothorax taiwanensis H. M. Chen, K. H. Loh & K. T. Shao, 2008 (Taiwanese moray)
 Gymnothorax thyrsoideus (J. Richardson, 1845) (Grey-face moray)
 Gymnothorax tile (F. Hamilton, 1822) (Indian mud moray)
 Gymnothorax undulatus (Lacépède, 1803) (Undulated moray)
 Gymnothorax unicolor (Delaroche, 1809) (Brown moray)
 Gymnothorax vagrans (Seale, 1917)
 Gymnothorax verrilli (D. S. Jordan & C. H. Gilbert, 1883) (White-edged moray)
 Gymnothorax vicinus (Castelnau, 1855) (Purple-mouth moray)
 Gymnothorax visakhaensis Mohapatra, Smith, Mohanty, Mishra & Tudu, 2017
 Gymnothorax walvisensis Prokofiev, 2009
 Gymnothorax woodwardi McCulloch, 1912
 Gymnothorax ypsilon Hatooka & J. E. Randall, 1992 (Y-bar moray)
 Gymnothorax zonipectis Seale, 1906 (Barred-fin moray)

Notes

References

 
Marine fish genera
Taxa named by Marcus Elieser Bloch